Fort Massey Cemetery is a military cemetery in Halifax, Nova Scotia dating back to the 1750s, and is the resting place for British and Canadian soldiers, veterans and spouses. The cemetery is named after Major General Eyre Massey. The cemetery is maintained by Veteran's Affairs Canada.

Notable interments 
It contains 86 Commonwealth burials of the First World War and 41 from the Second World War. Most of these graves are in a plot at the lower end of the cemetery, next to which stands the Cross of Sacrifice. The HALIFAX (FORT MASSEY) MEMORIAL stands within the cemetery and commemorates two servicemen who were killed in the 1917 explosion but whose bodies were not found.

Canadian Infantry (Nova Scotia Regiment):
 John Neal         Private   March 8, 1915
 Allan Mclean      Private   March 18, 1915
 Willis Henshaw    Private   April 18, 1915
 Alexander Duncan  Sergeant  March 23, 1918
 William Mills     Private   October 31, 1918
 Roderick Mcnutt   Corporal  January 15, 1920

Halifax Explosion
 Alexander Thompson Fyfe

References

External links 
 Site Plan - Veteran Affairs
 Photograph (1885)
 WWI Veterans Buried
 Fort Massey – Image (1782)
 

Cemeteries in Halifax, Nova Scotia
Canadian military memorials and cemeteries